The Harlequin is the fifteenth book in the Anita Blake: Vampire Hunter series of horror/mystery/erotica novels by Laurell K. Hamilton; it was released June 5, 2007.

Plot introduction
Anita Blake is about to face the challenge of her life. Into her world—a world already overflowing with power—have come creatures so feared that powerful, centuries-old vampires refuse to mention their names. It is forbidden to speak of The Harlequin unless you've been contacted. And to be contacted by The Harlequin can mean three things. It can mean that they're watching, or that they're tormenting, or that they're going to kill you. The Harlequin belong to Marmée Noire, the Mother of Darkness, a figure so old, it's not known whether she's a vampire, a lycanthrope or something else.

Long-time rivals for Anita's affections, Jean-Claude, Master Vampire of the City, and Richard Zeeman, Ulfric of the local werewolf pack, will need to become allies. Wereleopards Nathaniel and Micah will have to step up their support. And then there's Edward. In this situation, Anita knows that she needs to call the one man who has always been there for her, but he responds in a way that she didn't anticipate.

Explanation of the title
The book is named after the central adversaries, a cadre of vampires called the Harlequin that exist to police and punish vampire leaders who violate various rules (e.g., Malcolm's resistance to the blood oath). This is one of the few Anita Blake books that is not named after a place.

Plot summary

Summary
The events of The Harlequin take place one week after the events of Danse Macabre

The Harlequin shows Anita and Jean Claude coping with a threat from Vampire Council enforcers. Desperate, Anita calls Edward for assistance. Edward arrives the same day, bringing Olaf and Peter (now 16), who we last saw in Obsidian Butterfly.

The Harlequin exists to police and punish vampire leaders who violate various rules, such as Malcolm's resistance to the blood oath. It was formed by the Mother of All Darkness, modeled in style on the Commedia dell'arte and by action on the wild hunt. It is composed of very old and powerful vampires who are capable of not just manipulating the behaviors and emotions of humans or younger vampires and lycanthropes, but of Jean-Claude, Anita, and Richard. Under this influence, Richard and Jean-Claude nearly kill each other, and Anita must also be repeatedly resuscitated. Anita keeps them alive by feeding on first Rafael (and through him, all the wererats in the city); Belle Morte; and later, all the swanmanes in the United States via the swan king, Donovan Reece. Anita's second triumvirate also comes through, with Nathaniel and Damien "eating for five" so as to provide healing energy to Anita — and the others through her.

However, the Harlequin appears not to be following its own rules, so by vampire law Jean Claude's people can strike back. Edward doesn't actually kill a Harlequin, Anita does through a psychic link that she accidentally creates while trying to remove a sort of vampire spell that one of the Harlequin has put on her in order to keep track of her and Jean Claude's etc. movements. They subsequently end up killing the human servant of that vampire after Anita has fed on Donovan the king of the swan manes. They recover in time to face off with the remaining members in Malcolm's Church of Eternal Life. They not only succeed, but determine that the Harlequin members were planning to take over Jean-Claude's territory and not operating on official Council orders.

Anita almost allows the Mother of Darkness to become a full flesh being by allowing her anger to fester.

Anita also leaves her former allies, the werelions, to potential death. At a point where Anita and many of her other allies are injured, sex is demanded from the werelion Rex Joseph so that Anita could gain the power to heal. The rex refuses because he is married and values being faithful to his wife. In a scene reminiscent of The Godfather series, Anita decides that this is a betrayal of their alliance and decides to abandon Joseph.

Characters in The Harlequin

Major characters
The Harlequin features the following major characters.
 Anita Blake
 Jean-Claude
 Richard
 Asher
 Micah
 Damian
 Nathaniel
 Requiem

Other characters
Recurring characters include:
 Malcolm
 Olaf
 Peter
 Edward
 Remus
 Belle Morte
Non-recurring characters include:
 Mercia
 Soledad

References

External links
Official Site
Official Blog

2007 American novels
American erotic novels
Anita Blake: Vampire Hunter novels
Low fantasy novels
Berkley Books books